The fifth season of Frasier originally aired from September 23, 1997 to May 19, 1998 on NBC. The fifth episode is the only episode of the series to have scenes filmed on location in Seattle. 

In 2009, TV Guide ranked "The Ski Lodge" episode #31 on its list of the 100 Greatest Episodes.

Cast

Main
 Kelsey Grammer as Frasier Crane
 Jane Leeves as Daphne Moon
 David Hyde Pierce as Niles Crane
 Peri Gilpin as Roz Doyle
 Dan Butler as Bulldog
 John Mahoney as Martin Crane

Special guest
Marsha Mason as Sherry
Bebe Neuwirth as Lilith
Sela Ward as Kelly Easterbrook
Patti LuPone as Zora Crane

Recurring
Edward Hibbert as Gil Chesterton

Guest
Lindsay Frost as Samantha
Conrad Janis as Albert
Harriet Sansom Harris as Bebe Glazer
Cynthia Lamontagne as Annie
James Gleason as Ed
Bill Campbell as Clint Webber
James Patrick Stuart as Guy
Lindsay Price as Sharon
Lisa Edelstein as Caitlin
Tom McGowan as Kenny
Claire Yarlett as Vicky
Lisa Waltz as Tricia
Patrick Kerr as Noel Shempsky

Special appearance by
Norman B. Rice, Mayor of Seattle as himself
Larry King as himself
Lesley Stahl as herself

Episodes

References

1997 American television seasons
1998 American television seasons
Frasier 05